Spicetone is a music technology company focusing on guitar effect pedals. It was founded in Estonia by Vahur Afanasjev, Rein Sabolotny and Taivo Saarts in 2013.

References

External links

Effects units
Music equipment manufacturers
Guitar effects manufacturing companies
Technology companies of Estonia